Louise Brough successfully defended her title, defeating Margaret duPont in the final, 10–8, 1–6, 10–8 to win the ladies' singles tennis title at the 1949 Wimbledon Championships.

Seeds

  Louise Brough (champion)
  Margaret duPont (final)
  Pat Todd (semifinals)
  Gussie Moran (third round)
  Shirley Fry (fourth round)
  Jean Quertier (second round)
  Nelly Adamson (third round)
  Joan Curry (second round)

Draw

Finals

Top half

Section 1

Section 2

Section 3

Section 4

Bottom half

Section 5

Section 6

Section 7

Section 8

References

External links

Women's Singles
Wimbledon Championship by year – Women's singles
Wimbledon Championships
Wimbledon Championships